Saqqarlersuup Sullua (old spelling: Sarqardlersûp Suvdlua) is a strait in the Upernavik Archipelago in Avannaata municipality in northwestern Greenland.

Geography 

Located in the northern part of Upernavik Archipelago, it is an inner waterway of Melville Bay, linking Alison Bay in the northeast with the open waters of the former in the west. The strait separates Kiatassuaq Island in the south from Saqqarlersuaq Island in the north.

References 

Melville Bay
Straits of the Upernavik Archipelago